Motasim Billah Mazhabi is a citizen of Afghanistan who was a candidate in Afghanistan's 2009 Presidential elections.

Academic career

Mutasimbillah is from a family of religious scholars, and received religious instruction from his father Maulana Mohammad Ataullah Faizani and his uncle Maulana Gul Muhammad Kakar.
He also attended a secular high school in Kabul.

He earned a degree in economics from the Logistics and Military Economics Faculty of the Military University in Kabul.

Public service

Mutasimbillah left Afghanistan for Pakistan in 1985.  He also spent time in the United States.

He founded the magazine Balagh in 1993.  It is currently published in Pashto, Dari and English language editions, in Kabul.

According to a profile from the Pajhwok Afghan News Mutasimbillah worked on behalf of Afghans and Afghan expatriates, helping to found a school and a clinic for refugees in Peshawar, Pakistan, and a clinic in Paktia Province.
He helped found the Arianna Rehabilitation Association for Afghanistan in 1992.
He helped found the Islamic Council of the People of Afghanistan in 1996, and was its president until 1998.

Presidential candidacy, 2009

During the 2009 Presidential elections he stood 13th in a field of 38.
He won 7,841 votes.

References

Afghan economists
Magazine publishers (people)
1964 births
Living people
Afghan expatriates in Pakistan
21st-century Afghan politicians